"Beginner" is Japanese idol girl group AKB48's 18th single, released on October 27, 2010.

Release Information
Much like AKB48's previous singles such as "Heavy Rotation", "Beginner" was released in three different versions with five cover variations, with the theater version being exclusively sold in the AKB48 theater in Akihabara, Tokyo. Each version contained a different set list aside from the title track and "Boku Dake no Value". The third track on type A, "Kimi ni Tsuite" performed by Mint, was selected via a fan vote held on Ameba Pigg. In addition, the DVDs attached to all versions except for the theater version each contains three out of the possible six different music videos made for the single: Type A contained formations led by Yuko Oshima, Mariko Shinoda, and the duo of Mayu Watanabe and Jurina Matsui (SKE48), while type B featured formations led by Atsuko Maeda, Tomomi Itano, and Minami Takahashi. The original music video, directed by Tetsuya Nakashima, was found to be too violent to be included with the actual single; and that version was later decided to be released exclusively as a digital download from the day of the single's release.

All non-theater versions of "Beginner" also contain a ballot code that can be used to vote for one's favorite AKB48/SKE48/SDN48 song from all previous singles and theater shows, and the top 100 of that list will become the set list of the four-day marathon concert, AKB48 Request Hour Best 100 2011, which was later held in Shibuya-AX from January 20 to 23, 2011. In addition, all first press limited editions of "Beginner" contain a national handshaking event ticket, and can be used during the later handshaking tour to meet AKB48 members up close and in person. The theater version, on the other hand, contains a ticket to a special handshaking event commemorating the release of the theater version, as well as one photo card of a random member of AKB48.

"Beginner" managed to have 1.03 million copies shipped to retailers before its release, and sold 568,095 copies on its first day. By the end of its first week of release, "Beginner" has sold 826,989 copies and reach top spot on the Oricon weekly singles chart. This meant that Beginner became AKB48's 5th consecutive number 1 single, and has surpassed Speed's 1998 single, "All My True Love", as the best selling girl group single in its opening week on the Oricon. The sale figures also placed "Beginner" as the third best selling single in its debut week by a female artist of all time on the Oricon, behind Hikaru Utada's "Addicted to You", and Namie Amuro's "Can You Celebrate?", which sold 1.06 million and 828,000 copies in their opening week respectively. By selling almost 1 million copies by the end of the year, "Beginner" was the best-selling single of 2010 in Japan.

Track listing

Contributing members

Beginner
(Bold indicates front members who appears on regular and limited covers of the single)

Center: Atsuko Maeda
Team A: Haruna Kojima, Rino Sashihara, Mariko Shinoda, Aki Takajō, Minami Takahashi, Atsuko Maeda
Team K: Tomomi Itano, Yuko Oshima, Minami Minegishi, Sae Miyazawa
Team B: Tomomi Kasai, Yuki Kashiwagi, Rie Kitahara, Mayu Watanabe
SKE48 team S: Jurina Matsui, Rena Matsui

All senbatsu members who appear in this single have appeared in the last single, Heavy Rotation. Notable omissions from the last single include Erena Ono, who has graduated from AKB48 in September and Sayaka Akimoto, captain of Team K. Other senbatsu members from Heavy Rotation who did not make it are Amina Satō, Haruka Nakagawa, and Miho Miyazaki, who placed 18th, 20th, and 21st respectively at the general election.

Boku Dake no Value
Credited as Undergirls
Team A: Misaki Iwasa, Aika Ōta, Haruka Katayama, Haruka Nakagawa, Ami Maeda
Team K: Ayaka Kikuchi, Moeno Nitō, Reina Fujie, Sakiko Matsui, Rumi Yonezawa
Team B: Haruka Ishida, Manami Oku, Mika Komori, Sumire Satō, Natsumi Hirajima, Miho Miyazaki
SKE48 team S: Yuria Kizaki, Kumi Yagami
SKE48 team KII: Anna Ishida, Akane Takayanagi, Manatsu Mukaida

Kimi ni Tsuite
Credited as Mint
Team A: Haruka Katayama, Atsuko Maeda
Team K: Moeno Nitō, Sakiko Matsui
Team B: Tomomi Kasai

Nakeru Basho
Credited as Diva
(Bold indicates front members)
Team A: Shizuka Ōya, Asuka Kuramochi, Chisato Nakata, Sayaka Nakaya, Natsumi Matsubara,  
Team K: Sayaka Akimoto, Mayumi Uchida, Ayaka Umeda, Miku Tanabe, Tomomi Nakatsuka, Misato Nonaka
Team B: Kana Kobayashi, Amina Satō, Natsuki Sato, Mariya Suzuki, Rina Chikano, Yuka Masuda
SKE48 team S: Masana Ōya

Charts and certifications

Charts

Sales and certifications

References

2010 singles
AKB48 songs
Songs with lyrics by Yasushi Akimoto
Oricon Weekly number-one singles
Billboard Japan Hot 100 number-one singles
King Records (Japan) singles
2010 songs